Taylor-Corbett is a surname. Notable people with the surname include:

 Lynne Taylor-Corbett (born 1956), American choreographer, theater director, and musician
 Shaun Taylor-Corbett (born 1978), American actor, singer, and writer, son of Lynne

Compound surnames